Kani Seyf (also Romanized as Kānī Seyf) is a village in Beleh Keh Rural District, Alut District, Baneh County, Kurdistan Province, Iran. At the 2006 census, its population was 55, in 11 families. The village is populated by Kurds.

References 

Towns and villages in Baneh County